Central Hall is a historic commercial building located at Sea Cliff in Nassau County, New York.  It was built in 1894 and is a two-story, clapboard sided building with a low gable roof.  It originally served as a dry goods store and community meeting hall.

The structure was listed on the National Register of Historic Places in 1988.

References

Commercial buildings on the National Register of Historic Places in New York (state)
Commercial buildings completed in 1894
Buildings and structures in Nassau County, New York
National Register of Historic Places in Oyster Bay (town), New York